Jaroslav Netolička (born 3 March 1954, in Opava) is a Czech football goalkeeper. He obtained a total number of fifteen caps for Czechoslovakia national football team, in which he conceded ten goals.

Netolička began his playing career with Dukla Prague and TJ Vítkovice.

He was a participant in the 1980 Olympic Games, where Czechoslovakia won the gold medal, and in the 1980 UEFA European Championship, where Czechoslovakia won the bronze medal. He also won three times the Czechoslovak First League with Dukla Prague, in 1977, 1979 and 1982.

References

1954 births
Living people
Sportspeople from Opava
Czech footballers
Czechoslovak footballers
Association football goalkeepers
Footballers at the 1980 Summer Olympics
Olympic footballers of Czechoslovakia
Olympic gold medalists for Czechoslovakia
UEFA Euro 1980 players
Czechoslovakia international footballers
MFK Vítkovice players
Dukla Prague footballers
TSV 1860 Munich players
Sabah F.C. (Malaysia) players
Olympic medalists in football
FC Vysočina Jihlava managers
Expatriate footballers in West Germany
Czechoslovak expatriate sportspeople in West Germany
Czechoslovak expatriate footballers
Expatriate footballers in Malaysia
Czech expatriate sportspeople in Malaysia
Czechoslovak expatriate sportspeople in Malaysia
Medalists at the 1980 Summer Olympics
Czech football managers